This is a list of members of the Swiss Council of States of the 51st legislature (2019–2023). The members were elected in the 2019 Swiss federal election.

Elected members

See also
 Political parties of Switzerland for the abbreviations
 List of members of the Swiss Council of States (2015–2019)
 Presidents of the Council of States
 List of members of the Swiss National Council

References

2019
Switzerland